Baiting Hollow is a census-designated place (CDP) roughly corresponding to the hamlet by the same name in the Town of Riverhead in Suffolk County, on Long Island, in New York, United States. The CDP's population was 1,642 at the 2010 census.

Geography

Climate

Demographics

As of the census of 2000, there were 1,449 people, 600 households, and 429 families residing in the CDP. The population density was 448.7 per square mile (173.2/km2). There were 962 housing units at an average density of 297.9/sq mi (115.0/km2). The racial makeup of the CDP was 96.27% White, 1.38% African American, 0.55% Asian, 0.97% from other races, and 0.83% from two or more races. Hispanic or Latino of any race were 4.00% of the population.

There were 600 households, out of which 24.2% had children under the age of 18 living with them, 63.0% were married couples living together, 5.3% had a female householder with no husband present, and 28.5% were non-families. 24.3% of all households were made up of individuals, and 8.2% had someone living alone who was 65 years of age or older. The average household size was 2.39 and the average family size was 2.84.

In the CDP, the population was spread out, with 18.9% under the age of 18, 4.8% from 18 to 24, 29.3% from 25 to 44, 33.7% from 45 to 64, and 13.3% who were 65 years of age or older. The median age was 44 years. For every 100 females, there were 108.2 males. For every 100 females age 18 and over, there were 101.2 males.

The median income for a household in the CDP was $128,622, and the median income for a family was $126,455. Males had a median income of $128,036 versus $121,685 for females. The per capita income for the CDP was $96,375. About 1.8% of families and 4.4% of the population were below the poverty line, including none of those under age 18 and 13.8% of those age 65 or over.

Economy 

Long Island Spirits

Education

School district 
Baiting Hollow is located entirely within the boundaries of the Riverhead Central School District. As such, all children who reside within Baiting Hollow and attend public schools go to Riverhead's schools.

Library district 
Baiting Hollow is located within the boundaries of the Baiting Hollow Free Library. The boundaries of this library district correspond with those of the hamlet.

Notable people

 Charlie Jarzombek (September 30, 1942 – March 22, 1987) - professional race car driver.

References

Riverhead (town), New York
Census-designated places in New York (state)
Hamlets in New York (state)
Long Island Sound
Census-designated places in Suffolk County, New York
Hamlets in Suffolk County, New York
Populated coastal places in New York (state)